100% Scooter – 25 Years Wild & Wicked is a compilation album and a box set by German dance group Scooter, released on 15 December 2017 through Sheffield Tunes and Kontor Records.

Track listing

3-disc version

5-disc version

Limited Deluxe Box
The special collector's edition of the album, entitled 100% Scooter – 25 Years Wild & Wicked (Limited Deluxe Box), contains 5 CDs mentioned above, plus a vinyl LP of Olga Scheps' tribute album 100% Scooter – Piano Only, a MC with the megamix and selected tracks from another tribute album Hands On Scooter, and a 112 paged photo book including photos from 25 years of the band, lyrics of all singles and discography. This edition is limited to 2000 copies.

LP: Olga Scheps – 100% Scooter – Piano Only

MC: Exclusive Scooter MC

Charts

Olga Scheps – 100% Scooter – Piano Only

100% Scooter – Piano Only is a studio album by Russian-German classical pianist Olga Scheps, released on 15 December 2017 through Sheffield Tunes Classics and Kontor Records.

 For track listing see above.

References

2017 compilation albums
Scooter (band) albums